The 2010 USA Indoor Track and Field Championships was held at Albuquerque Convention Center in Albuquerque, New Mexico. Organized by USA Track and Field (USATF), the two-day competition took place February 27–28 and served as the national championships in indoor track and field for the United States. The championships in combined track and field events were held two weeks later from March 6–7 at Gladstein Fieldhouse  at Indiana University Bloomington, Indiana.

The competition served as the selection meet for the United States team for the 2010 IAAF World Indoor Championships, held in Doha, Qatar. Five American national champions went on to become world champions: Bernard Lagat in the 3000 meters, Christian Cantwell in the shot put, Debbie Dunn in the 400-meter dash, Lolo Jones in the 60-meter hurdles and Brittney Reese in the long jump.

Medal summary

Men

Women

References

Results
2010 USA Indoor Combined Events Championships Results. USATF. Retrieved 2019-06-13.
2010 USA Indoor Track & Field Championships Results. USATF. Retrieved 2019-06-13.

2010
Track and field indoor
USA Indoor Track and Field Championships
Sports in Albuquerque, New Mexico
Sports competitions in New Mexico
2010 in sports in New Mexico
Track and field in New Mexico
Events in Albuquerque, New Mexico